Urbanism is the study of how inhabitants of urban areas interact with the built environment.

Urbanism may also refer to:

 Urban planning
 Urban theory

See also
Urbanization
Urban (disambiguation)